Canningvale is a rural locality in the Southern Downs Region, Queensland, Australia.

History 
Canningvale was previously known as Jews Retreat.

References 

Southern Downs Region
Localities in Queensland